The Last Oricru is a 2022 action role-playing game developed by GoldKnights and published by Prime Matter.

Development
Development for the game began in 2017 using Unreal Engine 4. It is the first project of Czech studio GoldKnights. Around 40 developers worked on the game which was originally named Lost Hero. It changed its name to The Last Oricru in 2021 when Koch Media, now Plaion, was announced as game's publisher.

Plot
The Last Oricru is set on Planet Wardenia and follows the immortal warrior, Silver, who crash-landed on the planet and gets involved in the conflict between local factions.

Gameplay
Gameplay is inspired by Dark Souls. It gives large focus on story which is non-linear with every decision making changes in game's world.

Reception
The Last Oricru was released to mixed reviews. Metacritic listed The Last Oricru as the seventh-worst game of 2022.

References

External links
 

Action role-playing video games
Soulslike video games
2022 video games
Video games developed in the Czech Republic
Science fiction video games
Windows games
PlayStation 5 games
Xbox One games
Xbox Series X and Series S games